The Minister for Homelessness is an Australian Government cabinet position which is currently held by Julie Collins following the swearing in of the full Albanese ministry on 1 June 2022.

In the Government of Australia, the minister administers this portfolio through the Department of Social Services.

The ministry has been the outer ministry since it was first created in 2010. It was elevated to the cabinet during the Albanese ministry.

List of Ministers for Homelessness
The following individuals have been appointed as Minister for Homelessness, or any of its precedent titles:

List of Assistant Ministers for Homelessness
The following individuals have been appointed as Assistant Ministers for Homelessness, or any of its precedent titles:

References

External links
 

Homelessness